The Luponde Tea Estate is located in the Livingstone Mountains, at an altitude of 7,000 feet in Southern Tanzania. It was founded in 1954 and today covers 2,212 hectares.  Tea is grown on 730 hectares of land, including 20 hectares of herbal plants and 401 hectares of organic tea plantation. Today the estate produces an average of over two million kilograms of bag grade black tea per year and is one of the only steady sources of income for local residents who are capable of picking up to 80 kilograms of wet tea leaf per day.

History 
The vast majority of the worlds tea (with the exception of China) was originality planted by Dutch and British colonists, Tanzania is the only country in which tea was first planted by Germans. German control of the country lasted from the 1800s until 1919 when under the League of Nations, it became a British mandate until independence in 1961.

Many of the German settlers decided to stay on under British governance and eventually one settler decided to build a large tea garden and factory in the vicinity of the Usambara mountains. Due to the rich soil found in this district and the remarkable success of tea growing other planters, including Luponde, moved in and gradually the number of plantations increased. From the very beginning the Luponde Tea Estate proved that it was more than capable of producing extremely high quality teas and in recent years has earned a fair trade certification and has established an excellent track record of beneficial social and economic developments for its workers.

Recent developments have included the estate using some of its Fair Trade premiums to commission the construction of a Maize grinding mill. The construction of this mill enabled estate workers to take their own crops, grown on land provided by the estate, to have it ground close to home rather than walking for over 7 kilometres, as they previously had to do.

Certifications 
The Luponde Tea Estate has been Rainforest Alliance certified since 2012 and has been Fair Trade certified since 1994.

Environmental practices 
The Luponde Tea Estate has built up an excellent reputation for good environmental practices which include all natural methods of tea husbandry as opposed to chemical fertilizers and other synthetic agricultural inputs.

Luponde Tea 
The creation of the Luponde Tea business in the UK was conceived after its founders, Guy and Tamsin Lafferty visited the Luponde Tea Estate. After sampling the "exquisite taste" and realising that the  product was largely unknown outside of the general tea industry, the couple made it their own personal mission to bring this product to the rest of the world.

Following the creation of the business and subsequent store openings the team have gone on to aid the Luponde Tea Estate and the surrounding areas through local environmental investment. Projects include the planting of over 30,000 trees on disused areas which works towards balancing the company use of paper and gift wrapping card.

References

Tea estates
Agriculture in Tanzania